Gould may refer to:

People

 Gould (name), a surname

Places

United States
 Gould, Arkansas, a city
 Gould, Colorado, an unincorporated community
 Gould, Ohio, an unincorporated community
 Gould, Oklahoma, a town
 Gould, West Virginia, an unincorporated community
 Gould City, Michigan
 Gould City, Washington
 Gould Township, Minnesota

Multiple countries
 Gould Lake (disambiguation)
 Mount Gould (disambiguation)

Elsewhere
 Gould (crater), a lunar crater formation
 Gould Coast, Antarctica
 Gould Dome, Alberta, Canada

Other uses
 Gould baronets, two titles, one in the Baronetage of England and one in the Baronetage of Great Britain
 Gould Belt, a partial ring of stars in the Milky Way 
 Gould designation, a type of star identifier 
 Gould League, an independent Australian organisation promoting environmental education
 Gould Electronics, a company involved in the electronics and semiconductor industries
 Gould Racing, a British motorsport company
 USC Gould School of Law, a law school within the University of Southern California
 Gould Academy, Bethel, Maine, United States, a private college preparatory boarding and day school
 , a British Second World War frigate
 Gould Stradivarius, a violin made by Antonio Stradivari

See also 
 Gould City, Michigan, United States, an unincorporated community
 Gould City, Washington, United States, an unincorporated community
 Goulds (disambiguation)
 Goa'uld, a fictional race in the Stargate franchise
 Gold (disambiguation)